Wrecksite is a non-profit organization that documents maritime wrecks around the world and is free to use. Accessing more data requires a subscription. The website is the world largest online nautical wreck database, and has 187,030 wrecks and 164,050 positions, 62,730 images, 2,347 maritime charts, 31,070 ship owners and builders.

Bibliography 
Notes

References

 - Total pages: 217 

Internet properties established in 2001
Online databases